Maleniec may refer to the following places:
Maleniec, Łódź Voivodeship (central Poland)
Maleniec, Końskie County in Świętokrzyskie Voivodeship (south-central Poland)
Maleniec, Włoszczowa County in Świętokrzyskie Voivodeship (south-central Poland)
Maleniec, Pomeranian Voivodeship (north Poland)